Mierzwin may refer to the following places in Poland:
Mierzwin, Lower Silesian Voivodeship (south-west Poland)
Mierzwin, Kuyavian-Pomeranian Voivodeship (north-central Poland)
Mierzwin, Świętokrzyskie Voivodeship (south-central Poland)